Granichar may refer to the following places in Bulgaria:

Granichar, Burgas Province
Granichar, Dobrich Province